Kotlas is a town in Arkhangelsk Oblast, Russia.

Kotlas may also refer to:
Kotlas Urban Okrug, a municipal formation which the town of oblast significance of Kotlas in Arkhangelsk Oblast, Russia is incorporated as
Kotlas Airport, an airport in Arkhangelsk Oblast, Russia
MT Kotlas, a Russian product tanker

See also
Kotla (disambiguation)
Kotlassky District, a district of Arkhangelsk Oblast, Russia